The Achelata is an infra-order of the decapod crustaceans, holding the spiny lobsters, slipper lobsters and their fossil relatives.

Description
The name "Achelata" derives from the fact that all the members of this group lack the chelae (claws) that are found on almost all other decapods (from the Ancient Greek ,  = "not",  = "claw"). They are further united by the great enlargement of the second antennae, by the special "phyllosoma" form of the larva, and by a number of other characters.

Classification and fossil record
The infraorder Achelata belongs to the group Reptantia, which consists of the walking/crawling decapods (lobsters and crabs).  The cladogram below shows Achelata's placement within the larger order Decapoda, from analysis by Wolfe et al., 2019.

Achelata contains the spiny lobsters (Palinuridae), the slipper lobsters (Scyllaridae) and the furry lobsters (Synaxidae, now usually included in Palinuridae), as well as two extinct families, Cancrinidae and Tricarinidae.

Both Palinuridae and Scyllaridae have a fossil record extending back to the Cretaceous. The two fossil families contain a single genus each; Tricarina is known from a single Cretaceous fossil, while Cancrinos is known from the Jurassic and Cretaceous.

References

External links

 
Arthropod infraorders
Extant Late Jurassic first appearances